United Nations Security Council resolution 1015, adopted unanimously on 15 September 1995, after reaffirming all resolutions on the situation in the former Yugoslavia, in particular resolutions 943 (1994), 970 (1995), 988 (1995) and 1003 (1995), the Council noted measures by the Federal Republic of Yugoslavia (Serbia and Montenegro) to continue the border closure with Bosnia and Herzegovina and therefore extended the partial suspension of sanctions against Serbia and Montenegro for an additional 180 days until 18 March 1996.

It was noted that the border remained closed, except to humanitarian relief and the efforts of Serbia and Montenegro in this regard. There was greater co-operation between Serbia and Montenegro and the Mission of the International Conference on the Former Yugoslavia.

Acting under Chapter VII of the United Nations Charter, the international sanctions placed on Serbia and Montenegro were suspended until 18 March 1996. Restrictions and arrangements in resolutions 943 and 988 would continue to apply. The situation would remain constantly under review by the Security Council.

See also
 Bosnian War
 Breakup of Yugoslavia
 Croatian War of Independence
 List of United Nations Security Council Resolutions 1001 to 1100 (1995–1997)
 Yugoslav Wars

References

External links
 
Text of the Resolution at undocs.org

 1015
 1015
1995 in Yugoslavia
1995 in Bosnia and Herzegovina
 1015
September 1995 events
Sanctions against Yugoslavia